Mount Ararat is a mountain located in the Pennsylvania villages of Belmont Corners and Orson.  Its summit, which is in Orson, is the highest point in Wayne County, Pennsylvania, and one of the higher points in eastern Pennsylvania. Mount Ararat is located in the Glaciated Low Plateaus geological section of Pennsylvania. This section is characterized with low rolling hills and modest relief. This summit is of low relief but stands as a peak above the countryside.

The west and north sides of Mount Ararat drain into the East Branch of the Lackawanna River, thence into the Susquehanna River, and into Chesapeake Bay. The east side of Ararat drains into the West Branch of the Lackawaxen River, thence into the Delaware River, and into Delaware Bay.

Notes

References
 Alan R. Geyer (1979) "Outstanding Geologic Features of Pennsylvania", Geological Survey of Pennsylvania

Mountains of Pennsylvania
Landforms of Wayne County, Pennsylvania